Sibusiso Spoko Ntuli (born 10 October 1988 in Umlazi) is a South African football midfielder who currently plays for Milano United.

Career
He played for National First Division club Nathi Lions, AmaZulu and had a short stint with another First Division side Western Province United. and Cape Town. In July 2011, he joined Slovak club FC Nitra.

International career
Ntuli is a former South Africa U20 international striker.

References 

1988 births
Living people
South African soccer players
Association football midfielders
Western Province United F.C. players
AmaZulu F.C. players
F.C. Cape Town players
FC Nitra players
Slovak Super Liga players
South African expatriates in Slovakia
Expatriate footballers in Slovakia
People from KwaZulu-Natal
Nathi Lions F.C. players